Epic Sciences is a company that was founded to develop medical diagnostics characterizing circulating tumor cells; its initial product offering was a non-medical service offering analysis services to companies developing drugs.

Epic was founded in 2008, and technology was licensed from Scripps Research Institute, based on inventions made by Peter Kuhn's lab at Scripps.  The company's approach involves getting a blood sample, removing red blood cells, putting the remaining cells on a microscope slide, staining the cells with antibodies for a few cancer markers, imaging the slide, then using proprietary image analysis software that counts the stained cells and analyzes the cells based on morphophology and other factors; as of 2014 it took the software around two and a half hours to analyze a single slide; around 12 slides are generated from a standard 7.5 mL blood sample.  As of 2014 it was offering its analysis services to drug companies as a way to measure outcomes in clinical trials.

David Nelson was the first President and CEO and in 2012 Epic raised $13M in 2012 from Domain Associates, Roche Venture Fund and Pfizer Venture Investments.

By 2014 Murali Prahalad was president and CEO and in July of that year the company raised an additional $30M.  In April 2017, Epic raised another $40 million and as of that date had raise a total of $85.5 million.

In March 2019, Lloyd Sanders joined the company as president and chief executive officer after serving at Myriad Genetics as the president of the oncology segment, overseeing the oncology, urology and dermatology commercial organizations.

References

External links 
 

Biotechnology companies of the United States
Companies based in San Diego
Biotechnology companies established in 2010
2010 establishments in California
Medical and health organizations based in California